Sheykh Khvajeh (also Romanized as Sheykh Khvājeh; also known as Sheykh Khvājeh-ye Bālā and Sheykh Khvājeh-ye ‘Olyā) is a village in Emamzadeh Jafar Rural District, in the Central District of Gachsaran County, Kohgiluyeh and Boyer-Ahmad Province, Iran. At the 2006 census, its population was 27, in 6 families.

References 

Populated places in Gachsaran County